The Regis Rangers are the athletic teams that represent Regis University, located in Denver, Colorado, in NCAA Division II intercollegiate sports. The Rangers compete as members of the Rocky Mountain Athletic Conference for all 12 varsity sports.

Athletic director
Ann Martin was promoted to the position of athletic director in 2010, succeeding Barb Schroeder who retired after being director for nearly fifteen years.

Varsity sports

Teams

Men's sports
 Baseball
 Basketball
 Cross Country
 Golf
 Soccer

Women's sports
 Basketball
 Cross Country
 Golf
 Lacrosse
 Soccer
 Softball
 Volleyball

References

External links